Sebastián Martínez may refer to:

Sebastián Martínez (actor) (born 1981), Colombian actor
Sebastián Martínez (footballer, born 1977), Austrian former footballer
Sebastián Martínez (footballer, born 1993), Chilean footballer
Sebastián Martínez (footballer, born 1983), Uruguayan footballer
Sebastián Martínez (footballer, born 2001), Mexican footballer
Sebastián Martínez (footballer, born 2003), Mexican footballer

See also
Daniel Sebastián Martínez (born 1981), Uruguayan footballer